CommunicAsia is an information and communications technology (ICT) exhibition and conference held in Singapore. The annual event has taken place since 1979 and is usually held in June. The show customarily runs concurrently with the BroadcastAsia and EnterpriseIT exhibitions and conferences, all of which are operated by Singapore Exhibition Services.

Overview 
The CommunicAsia Exhibition is amongst the largest platforms organized for the ICT industry in the Asia-Pacific region. It draws global industry brands to showcase key and emerging technologies. Past exhibitors include LG, Yahoo!, Huawei, Skype, Research in Motion (Blackberry) and Samsung.  Attendance is restricted to trade professionals, but admission is free.

The CommunicAsia Summit features roundtable discussions, forums, and presentations on a broad range of industry specific subjects. The summit draws participation from top experts and managers from the telecommunications, service provider and satellite sectors as well as senior government functionaries and regulators.

History

Prior to 2009 
From 1979 to 1999 the show was a biennial event. It was held at the World Trade Centre, Singapore, from 1979 up until it moved to Suntec for the 1996 and 1998 shows.  In 1999 CommunicAsia was held at Singapore Expo, where it continued to be hosted up until 2010. It was cancelled in 2003 due to an outbreak of SARS.

2009 
CommunicAsia 2009 ran from 16 –  19 June 2009 and the tradeshow featured 1,923 exhibiting companies from 60 countries and regions. The event attracted a total of 54,354 visitors from 100 countries spanning Asia-Pacific, Europe, US and the Middle-East.

Significant announcements at the event included the launch of two new smartphones by Huawei  – the Android-powered U8230 and the C8000, running the Windows Mobile operating system. LG also unveiled its Crystal GD900, the world's first transparent phone, while Samsung introduced its next era of smartphones in a worldwide launch. Garmin and ASUS also announced a first ever collaboration, the Garmin-ASUS nuvifones G60 and M20, smartphones with location-based capabilities.

The CommunicAsia 2009 Summit attracted 700 delegates and covered topics such as Mobile Services and Business Models, Network Enablers and Architectures, Satellite Communications Forum, Green Telecoms, Mobile Marketing and Advertising, Mobile TV and Entertainment, IPTV and Next Generation Broadband.

2010 
Held from 15–18 June at the Singapore Expo, CommunicAsia 2010 attracted over 55,000 industry visitors, conference speakers and delegates.   55% of visitors came from overseas, mostly from Indonesia, Malaysia and Thailand.

CommunicAsia 2010 witnessed the launch of the Alcatel One Touch Net mobile by Yahoo! and Skype announcing the availability of its interface on three Sony Ericsson Symbian-based smartphones. Other announcements made at the event included the unveiling by Samsung of the Wave and Wave Pro and NTTDOCOMO's F-04B, a separable phone that allows users to talk and view their phone at the same time.

It is estimated that deals worth over of $US3.6 billion were signed at the tradeshow.

The CommunicAsia Summit drew 650 participants and discussed topics including Mobile Value Added Services, Network Security, Getting in on the Cloud, Converged Device Management, Mobile Marketing & Profitability and New Revenue Opportunities.   The keynote address was delivered by Josh Silverman, CEO of Skype.

2011 
The 2011 exhibition and conference was held from 21–24 June at Marina Bay Sands and closed with strong results.

2012 
CommunicAsia2012 was once again held at Marina Bay Sands from 19–22 June 2012.

Over 200 debut exhibitors such as AMOS-Spacecom, Calix Networks, Integrasco, Mentum, NovelSat, SLA Mobile and Yokogawa Engineering Asia, shared their expertise and launch their latest products and solutions at the show.

EnterpriseIT, held in conjunction with CommunicAsia, showcased exhibitors comprising international IT systems providers and companies offering enterprise solutions ranging from cloud computing, data centre services, security and M2M software to mobility solutions and video conferencing.

The show featured notable product launches from the likes of Huawei, Panasonic, Blackmagic Design, among others.

The event saw Asia's largest satellite representation in a technology trade event, and also offered conferences and meetings with over 350 experts. The show closed with healthy visitor figures on 22 June 2012.

2013 
CommunicAsia2013 was held from 18–21 June 2013 at Marina Bay Sands for the third time.

2014  
CommunicAsia 2014 was held from 17–20 June 2014 at Marina Bay Sands.

2017  
CommunicAsia 2017 was held from 23–25 May 2017 at Marina Bay Sands.

References

External links
 CommunicAsia Homepage

Business conferences
1979 establishments in Singapore
Information and communications technology